Gofrid Jacob Fleischman (August 15, 1901 - April 27, 1988) was a professional American football player with the Detroit Panthers and the Providence Steam Roller of the National Football League. He was also named to the Green Bay Press-Gazette and Chicago Herald All-Pro teams in 1927. In 1928, he won an NFL Championship with Providence. Prior to joining the NFL, Jack played college football at Purdue University.

Outside of football, Jack played minor league baseball in 1920 with the Winston-Salem Twins of the Piedmont League.

Notes

1901 births
1988 deaths
Players of American football from Michigan
Baseball players from Michigan
Detroit Panthers players
Providence Steam Roller players
Winston-Salem Twins players
Purdue Boilermakers football players